The president of Paraguay, officially known as the President of the Republic of Paraguay, is according to the Constitution of Paraguay the head of the executive branch of the Government of Paraguay, both head of state and head of government. His honorific title is Su Excelencia.

Under the 1992 constitution, the president is limited to a single five-year term. An attempt by the Senate to abolish term limits on 1 April 2017 resulted in protests; it was ultimately rejected.

The presidential seat is the Palacio de los López, in Asunción. The presidential residence is the Mburuvichá Roga, also in Asunción.

Once presidents leave office, they are granted by the Constitution of Paraguay the speaking-but-non-voting position of senator for life.

The current president of Paraguay is Mario Abdo Benítez, since 15 August 2018.

List of presidents

Latest election

See also 
First Lady of Paraguay
List of presidents of Paraguay

References

External links 
 Presidency of the Republic of Paraguay

Paraguay, President of
Presidents of Paraguay
Presidents
Presidents
1844 establishments in Paraguay